The 1954 Syracuse Orangemen football team represented Syracuse University in the 1954 college football season. The Orangemen were led by sixth-year head coach Ben Schwartzwalder and played their home games at Archbold Stadium in Syracuse, New York. Syracuse finished the season with a 4–4 record and were not invited to a bowl game.

Schedule

Roster
 HB Jim Brown, sophomore

References

Syracuse
Syracuse Orange football seasons
Syracuse Orangemen football